Hammeren Lighthouse ( is located on the Hammeren peninsula on the northwestern tip of the Danish island of Bornholm.

History
An older, coal-fired lighthouse built in 1802 and modernized in 1837 was taken out of operation in 1872 when it was decided to build a new, taller replacement close to the very highest point on Hammeren, Stejlebjerg. Its height, however, proved to be a problem as it could not always be seen from the sea in foggy weather. It was therefore decided in 1895 to build a second lighthouse, Hammer Odde Lighthouse.

The lighthouse
Inactive since 1990, it is situated on the heights of Stejlebjerg. It is a circular granite tower (built beside a 1-1/2 storied keeper's house in brick) and stands in a very scenic natural area (surrounded by small coniferous vegetation) with many old monuments. This lighthouse replaced the Stejlebjerg Lighthouse, established in 1802, which was closer to Hammerodde. Built in 1871, Hammeren Lighthouse was functional between 1872 and 1990, with electrification provided in 1947. This was considered too high to be seen in foggy weather. Visitors are permitted to enter the tower during the summer period. On a clear day, views extend to the Swedish coast.

See also

List of lighthouses and lightvessels in Denmark

References

Lighthouses completed in 1802
Lighthouses in Denmark
Buildings and structures in Bornholm